Mokolé is a 1999 role-playing game supplement for Werewolf: The Apocalypse published by White Wolf Publishing.

Contents
Mokolé is a supplement in which the reptilian Mokolé changers are detailed.

Reception
Mokolé was reviewed in the online second version of Pyramid which said "Mokole and Ratkin are the latest Breedbooks for Werewolf: The Apocalypse. The Breedbooks have succeeded in being very good sourcebooks and very good reads, even if the characters they describe are supposed to be rare as hen's teeth."

Reviews
Backstab #19
Dragão Brasil #30 (Sep 1997) p. 40-41
Dragão Brasil #77 (Aug 2001) p. 4
Dragão Brasil #84 (Mar 2002) p. 4

References

Role-playing game books
Role-playing game supplements introduced in 1999
Werewolf: The Apocalypse